Maria Cioncan (19 June 1977 - 21 January 2007) was a middle distance runner from Romania, best known for winning a bronze medal in the 1500 metres event at the 2004 Summer Olympics.

Life
Born in Maieru, she set personal bests in both 800 and 1500 metres during the games. Her 2005 season was cut short, and her only notable competition appearance was at the SPAR European Cup in Firenze, Italy where she won the 800 (2:00.88) and placed second in the 1500 (4:07.39). Cioncan's last competition on the top international level was the 2006 World Indoor Championships, where she failed to progress past the first heat of the 800m. Earlier that indoor season she ran an indoor personal best of 2:01.70.

On 21 January 2007 Cioncan died in a car accident near Pleven, Bulgaria. She was returning from a training camp in Greece when her vehicle flipped over and struck a tree, killing her instantly.

Achievements

Personal bests
800 metres - 1:59.44 min (2004)
1500 metres - 3:58.39 min (2004)
3000 metres - 8:57.71 min (2002)

External links

http://www.focus-fen.net/index.php?id=n103809

1977 births
2007 deaths
Romanian female middle-distance runners
People from Bistrița-Năsăud County
Athletes (track and field) at the 2004 Summer Olympics
Olympic athletes of Romania
Road incident deaths in Bulgaria
Olympic bronze medalists in athletics (track and field)
Medalists at the 2004 Summer Olympics
Olympic bronze medalists for Romania